Santiago Ricci (also known as Roi) is an Argentine film and commercial editor, and commercial director.

He has worked on films including Bolivia (2001), La ciénaga, (2001),  Un oso rojo (2002), La niña santa (2004) and Rives (2011).

Filmography
 Lisboa (1999) a.k.a. Lisbon Tesoro mío (2000) a.k.a. Los aventureros de Rosario Bolivia (2001)
 La ciénaga (2001) a.k.a. The Swamp
 Negro (2001)
 Sudeste (2001) a.k.a. Southeast
 Un oso rojo (2002) a.k.a. A Red Bear
 La niña santa (2004) a.k.a. The Holy Girl
 La vida por Perón (2005) a.k.a. My Life for Perón
 Rives (2011) a.k.a. Day

Footnotes

External links
 
 

Argentine film editors
Living people
Year of birth missing (living people)
Place of birth missing (living people)